This is a list of National Basketball Association players whose last names begin with L.

The list also includes players from the American National Basketball League (NBL), the Basketball Association of America (BAA), and the original American Basketball Association (ABA). All of these leagues contributed to the formation of the present-day NBA.

Individuals who played in the NBL prior to its 1949 merger with the BAA are listed in italics, as they are not traditionally listed in the NBA's official player registers.

L

Skal Labissière
Reggie Lacefield
Sam Lacey
Bob Lackey
Fred LaCour
Edgar Lacy
Wendell Ladner
Christian Laettner
Oliver Lafayette
Raef LaFrentz
Tom LaGarde
Bill Laimbeer
Nick Lalich
Pete Lalich
Gene Lalley
Bo Lamar
Anthony Lamb
Doron Lamb
Jeremy Lamb
John Lambert
Buck Lamme
Jeff Lamp
Maciej Lampe
Jim Lampley
Sean Lampley
Jock Landale
Carl Landry
Marcus Landry
Mark Landsberger
Bill Lane
Jerome Lane
Andrew Lang
Antonio Lang
James Lang
Trajan Langdon
Dick Lange
Keith Langford
Romeo Langford
Dan Langhi
Bob Lanier
Stu Lantz
Nicolás Laprovíttola
Jake LaRavia
York Larese
Shane Larkin
Rusty LaRue
Rudy LaRusso
John Laskowski
Stephane Lasme
Dave Latter
Dave Lattin
Priest Lauderdale
Bill Laughlin
Rich Laurel
Harry Laurie
Walt Lautenbach
Rube Lautenschlager
Joffrey Lauvergne
Tony Lavelli
Zach LaVine
Bob Lavoy
Acie Law
Vic Law
Gani Lawal
Edmund Lawrence
Tim Lawry
A. J. Lawson
Jason Lawson
Ty Lawson
Jake Layman
Mo Layton
T. J. Leaf
Manny Leaks
Hal Lear
Allen Leavell
Jeff Lebo
Eric Leckner
Jalen Lecque
Ricky Ledo
Butch Lee
Clyde Lee
Courtney Lee
Damion Lee
Dave Lee
David Lee
Dick Lee
Doug Lee
George Lee
Greg Lee
Keith Lee
Kurk Lee
Malcolm Lee
Rock Lee
Ron Lee
Russ Lee
Saben Lee
Ed Leede
Sew Leeka
Hank Lefkowitz
Tim Legler
George Lehmann
Barry Leibowitz
Walt Lemon Jr.
Alex Len
Voshon Lenard
Johnny Lenhart
Leary Lentz
Bobby Leonard
Gary Leonard
Kawhi Leonard
Meyers Leonard
Jim Les
Travis Leslie
Ronnie Lester
Clifford Lett
Jon Leuer
Andrew Levane
Fat Lever
Caris LeVert
Sid Levine
Cliff Levingston
Ed Lewinski
Bobby Lewis
Cedric Lewis
Fred Lewis
Freddie Lewis
Garland Lewis
Grady Lewis
Kira Lewis Jr.
Martin Lewis
Mike Lewis
Quincy Lewis
Ralph Lewis
Rashard Lewis
Reggie Lewis
Scottie Lewis
Marcus Liberty
Todd Lichti
Sam Lieberman
DeAndre Liggins
Bill Ligon
Jim Ligon
Karl Lillge
Damian Lillard
Jeremy Lin
Bud Lindberg
Steve Lingenfelter
Leroy Lins
Frank Linskey
Alton Lister
Nassir Little
Sam Little
Gene Littles
Isaiah Livers
Randy Livingston
Shaun Livingston
Ron Livingstone
Horacio Llamas
Bill Lloyd
Bob Lloyd
Chuck Lloyd
Earl Lloyd
Lewis Lloyd
Scott Lloyd
Riney Lochmann
Bob Lochmueller
Rob Lock
Darrell Lockhart
Ian Lockhart
Kevin Loder
Don Lofgran
Kenneth Lofton Jr.
Zach Lofton
Henry Logan
Johnny Logan
Brad Lohaus
Art Long
Grant Long
John Long
Paul Long
Shawn Long
Willie Long
Luc Longley
Slim Lonsdorf
Kevon Looney
Brook Lopez
Felipe Lopez
Raül López
Robin Lopez
Del Loranger
Joe Lord
Gene Lorendo
Ryan Lorthridge
Jim Loscutoff
Plummer Lott
Sam Loucks
Kevin Loughery
Bob Love
Kevin Love
Stan Love
Clyde Lovellette
Sidney Lowe
Charlie Lowery
Kyle Lowry
Bobby Lowther
Carl Loyd
Jordan Loyd
Al Lucas
Jerry Lucas
John Lucas
John Lucas III
Kalin Lucas
Maurice Lucas
Ted Luckenbill
Tyronn Lue
James Luisi
Al Lujack
Phil Lumpkin
Ray Lumpp
Gabriel Lundberg
Timothé Luwawu-Cabarrot
Tyler Lydon
Trey Lyles
R. B. Lynam
George Lynch
Kevin Lynch
Lonnie Lynn
Mike Lynn
Bob Lytle

References
  NBA & ABA Players with Last Names Starting with L @ basketball-reference.com
 NBL Players with Last Names Starting with L @ basketball-reference.com

L